This is a list of public art in Millbank, a district in the City of Westminster, London.

Millbank is the location of Tate Britain and the Chelsea College of Arts; the latter institution's Rootstein Hopkins Parade Ground is a large temporary exhibition space for the work of students and established artists.

References

Bibliography

 

Millbank
Public art